Elections to the Territorial Assembly were held in French Dahomey on 31 March 1957.  The result was a victory for the Republican Party of Dahomey, which won 35 of the 60 seats.

Results

Figures for independent candidates include the Independents of the North.

References

Elections in Benin
Dahomey
1957 in French Dahomey
Election and referendum articles with incomplete results